The Newton Cannon House in College Grove, Tennessee, was the home of Newton Cannon, who was a U.S. Congressman and Governor of Tennessee.  The earliest section of the building was built circa 1800 as a log structure. The house was listed on the National Register of Historic Places. After the house was burned in an arson fire on January 27, 1987, it was removed from the National Register.

References

Former National Register of Historic Places in Tennessee
Houses in Williamson County, Tennessee
Houses completed in 1800
Houses on the National Register of Historic Places in Tennessee
National Register of Historic Places in Williamson County, Tennessee
Governor of Tennessee